The year 1527 in science and technology included a number of events, some of which are listed here.

Mathematics
 Petrus Apianus publishes a handbook of commercial arithmetic, Ein newe und wolgegründete underweisung aller Kauffmanns Rechnung in dreyen Büchern, mit schönen Regeln und fragstücken begriffen, at Ingolstadt.

Military science
 Albrecht Dürer publishes a treatise on fortifications, in Nuremberg.

Births
 c. May 1 – Jan Van Ostaeyen (Johannes Stadius), Flemish mathematician and astronomer (died 1579)
 July 13 – John Dee, English alchemist, astrologer and mathematician (died 1609)

Deaths
 January 21 – Juan de Grijalva, Spanish explorer (born c. 1489)
 July 28 – Rodrigo de Bastidas, Spanish explorer (born c. 1460)

References

 
16th century in science
1520s in science